Irondino Ferreira Neto or simply Dininho  (born July 23, 1975 in Itapagipe-MG), is a Brazilian central defender. He currently plays for Grêmio Catanduvense de Futebol.

Club statistics

Flamengo career statistics
(Correct  October 19, 2008)

according to combined sources on the.

Honours
São Caetano
São Paulo State Championship: 2004
Palmeiras
São Paulo State Championship: 2008

References

External links

 dininho official site
 sambafoot
 Guardian Stats Centre
 zerozero.pt
 globoesporte

1975 births
Living people
Brazilian footballers
Brazilian expatriate footballers
CR Flamengo footballers
Mirassol Futebol Clube players
Mogi Mirim Esporte Clube players
América Futebol Clube (SP) players
Associação Desportiva São Caetano players
Sanfrecce Hiroshima players
Sociedade Esportiva Palmeiras players
Esporte Clube Santo André players
Expatriate footballers in Japan
J1 League players
Association football defenders